Mary Gordon, C.M., B.A., (born 13 October 1947) is a Canadian educator, social entrepreneur, child advocate and parenting expert. She is the founder and president of both Roots of Empathy and Seeds of Empathy, non-profit evidence-based programs dedicated to promoting emotional literacy and empathy among children.

Biography
Gordon grew up in Newfoundland, but later moved to Toronto, Ontario. In her early career, she was a kindergarten teacher. In 1981, she founded Canada's first school-based Parenting and Family Literacy centres, which have become public policy in Ontario and are being used as a model for similar programs internationally.

In 1996, she founded Roots of Empathy, a classroom-based program for children in elementary school, and in 2005 she founded Seeds of Empathy, a related program for younger children in early childhood settings.

Selected works
Gordon's 2005 Canadian non-fiction bestseller, Roots of Empathy: Changing the World Child by Child, concerns child development and empathy and outlines the philosophy behind the Roots of Empathy program. It was ranked as one of the Top 100 Books of the Year in the category of "Ideas" by The Globe and Mail in 2006.

Speaking and consulting
Gordon is an international public speaker and often acts as an advisor for governments, educational organizations, and public institutions. She has presented on early childhood development to conferences organized by the World Health Organization, and the United States government, among others. She worked with the World Health Organization's Commission on the Social Determinants of Health's Knowledge Network for Early Childhood Development for their report Total Environment Assessment Model for Early Childhood Development. She was also invited to share her parenting expertise with the Nelson Mandela Children's Foundation in South Africa.

Gordon has twice been invited to meet with the Dalai Lama. Their first meeting was in 2006, at the Vancouver Dialogues, and their second was in 2008, in Seattle, Washington, as part of the Dalai Lama's Seeds of Compassion event. The Dalai Lama has said he believes programs such as Gordon's Roots of Empathy will build world peace.

Awards and appointments
Gordon is the recipient of several prestigious awards recognizing her contribution to innovation in education and international social entrepreneurship, including The Fraser Mustard Award and a Distinguished Canadian Educator Award. In 2002, she was selected as the first female Canadian Fellow in the Ashoka Foundation. an international organization that supports social entrepreneurs. She is currently a member of the Ashoka Foundation's board of directors. In 2006, she was invested as a Member of the Order of Canada. In July 2009, she was given the Public Education Advocacy Award by the Canadian Teachers' Federation. In 2018, she was appointed to the Order of Ontario, the province's highest honour,  for her work as a "social entrepreneur, educator, author, child advocate and parenting expert".

References

External links
 Roots of Empathy website

1947 births
Living people
Canadian educators
Members of the Order of Canada
Members of the Order of Ontario
Ashoka Canada Fellows